Tourism in Afghanistan is regulated by the Ministry of Information and Culture. There are at least 350 tourism companies operating in Afghanistan. Tourism was at its peak before the 1978 Saur Revolution, which was followed by the decades of war. Between 2013 and 2016, Afghan embassies issued between 15,000 and 20,000 tourist visas annually.

Afghanistan has four international airports, which include Kabul International Airport, Mazar-i-Sharif International Airport, the Ahmad Shah Baba International Airport in Kandahar, and Herat International Airport. It also has a number of smaller domestic airports such as Bamyan Airport, Bost Airport, Chaghcharan Airport, Farah Airport, Fayzabad Airport, Ghazni Airport, Jalalabad Airport, Khost Airport, Kunduz Airport, Maymana Airport, Nili Airport, Tarinkot Airport, and Zaranj Airport.

Guest houses and hotels are found in every city of Afghanistan. Some of the major hotels in Kabul are the Serena Hotel, the Hotel Inter-Continental Kabul, and the Safi Landmark Hotel. Most places in the country serve traditional Afghan cuisine.

Badakhshan

Fayzabad, the capital and largest city of Badakhshan Province, has several hotels and tourist attractions. The Fayzabad Airport serves the population of the entire province. There is also a road network from Fayzabad to other districts. Tourists can book a hotel in the city and then drive from there to Ishkashim, which is a border town next to the Afghanistan–Tajikistan border. They can then drive to the Wakhan National Park in Wakhan District to as far as Baza'i Gonbad or the Wakhjir Pass (Afghanistan–China border). Wakhan is one of the most coldest and isolated districts of Afghanistan.

Balkh

The Shrine of Ali is located in the center of Mazar-i-Sharif. From there many people visit the border town of Hairatan, which sits next to the Amu River near the Afghanistan–Uzbekistan border.

Bamyan

The Band-e Amir National Park is located in the Bamyan Province of Afghanistan. There are several modern hotels in Bamyan, which is the capital of the province. The site of the Buddhas of Bamyan is also located in this province. Some people visit Bamyan in the winter for skiing purposes. Below are some notable tourist sites in Bamyan Province:
Band-e Amir National Park
Buddhas of Bamiyan
Shahr-e Gholghola
Zuhak

Ghazni

A number of mausoleums of Ghaznavid rulers are located in and around the ancient city of Ghazni. Below are some notable sites for travelers to visit in Ghazni Province:
Band-e Sultan
Burial site of Al-Biruni
Burial site of Mahmud of Ghazni
Citadel of Ghazni
Ghazni Minarets
Jaghori
Sardeh Band Dam

Herat

Herat, which is the capital of Herat Province, is an ancient city that has many historical sites for visitors to see. Below are some notable tourist sites in Herat Province:
Gawhar Shad Mausoleum
Great Mosque of Herat
Herat Citadel
Islam Qala (border town near the Afghanistan–Iran border)
Jihad Museum
Musalla complex
Salma Dam (Afghanistan-India Friendship Dam)
Shrine of Khwaja Abd Allah
Takht-e Safar

Kabul

Kabul has many hotels, guest houses and tourist attractions. The Kabul International Airport has an international terminal and a domestic terminal. There is also a bus terminal that provides coach (bus) service to other provinces of the country.

The Ghazi Stadium often hosts football matches. Next to the stadium is an indoor skating ground called Skateistan. There are two bowling alleys, one is named Bravo Bowling and Cafe while the other is named Striker Bowling. There are also two indoor water parks, and several snooker and billiards clubs in different parts of the city. Below are some notable sites for travelers to visit in Kabul Province:

Abdul Rahman Mosque

The Abdul Rahman Mosque, which was completed in late 2009 and officially inaugurated in July 2012, is one of the largest mosques in Kabul. It is adjacent to the Zarnegar Park in the Wazir Akbar Khan neighborhood of the city, not far from the Kabul Serena Hotel.

Bagh-e Babur

The Gardens of Babur is a historic park in Kabul. It is the resting-place of Babur, the first emperor of the Mughal Empire. The gardens are thought to have been developed in the 16th century when Babur gave orders for the construction of an avenue garden in the city, described in some detail in his memoirs, the Baburnama.

Bagh-e Bala

Bala Hissar

The Bala Hissar is a fortress believed to be built over 1,500 years ago. It was last destroyed by the British in the 19th century and then abandoned. It is being restored.

Chihil Sutun

The Chihil Sutun Palace was built in the late 19th century for Habibullah Khan, who was Prince at the time. It was later used primarily as a guest house for diplomats and important figures such as U.S. President Eisenhower and Nikita Khrushchev of the USSR.

Darul Aman Palace
The Darul Aman Palace (King's Palace) was built for King Amanullah Khan. It sits directly across from the parliament building in the southern section of the city.

Id Gah Mosque

The Id Gah Mosque is one of the oldest and largest mosques in Kabul. Its historical importance has been that of Faisal Mosque in Islamabad, Pakistan, where top officials and the city's wealthy people would perform Eid prayers.

Habibullah Zazai Park
Habibullah Zazai Park is the largest amusement park located in and around Ahmad Shah Baba Mina, which is in the far eastern part of Kabul. The park sits on a hillside and provides large walking space with great views of the city. Another such park is called the City Park, which is much smaller and located near Kabul Zoo.

Kabul Zoo

Kabul Zoo has around 280 animals, which includes 45 species of birds and mammals and 36 species of fish. Among the animals there are two lions and a khanzir (pig), which is extremely rare in Afghanistan. As many as 5,000 people visit the zoo during the weekends.

National Museum of Afghanistan

The National Museum of Afghanistan sits next to the Darul Aman Palace in the southeastern section of the city. The museum's collection had earlier been one of the most important in Central Asia, with over 100,000 items dating back several millennia. With the start of the civil war in 1992, the museum was looted numerous times resulting in a loss of 70% of the 100,000 objects on display. Since 2007, a number of international organizations have helped to recover over 8,000 artifacts, the most recent being a limestone sculpture from Germany. Approximately 843 artifacts were returned by the United Kingdom in 2012, including the famous 1st Century Bagram Ivories.

Paghman

Paghman has been used historically as a summer retreat. Most people go there for backpacking (hiking) and see large European style mansions and other structures, including the Paghman Citadel which was recently built. It is located northwest of Kabul. The Qargha picnic area is located on the way to Paghman. The area is being developed by the government to attract more visitors. There are a number of places to eat and relax.

Sakhi Shrine

Shah wa Arus Dam

Tajbeg Palace

The Tajbeg Palace (Queen's Palace) was built in the 1920's by King Amanullah Khan for Queen Soraya. It is located near the Darul Aman Palace. One of its purposes was for women of Afghanistan to address their issues with the Queen. Another was for women only parties to take place there. Afghanistan has always been a very conservative country where men and women do not sit or party together.

Kandahar

Visiting Kandahar Province has long been avoided by foreign tourists due to insecurity. Despite that, a number of foreigners have visited the province in recent years. Aino Mina, which is located in the northeast of Kandahar, has a number of large mosques, parks, hotels, places to shop and eat, sports facilities, etc. There is also a bus terminal in Aino Mina. Another is located in the western end of Kandahar. Below are some notable sites for travelers to visit in Kandahar Province:
Chilzina Park (historical site in Sarpuza)
Dahla Dam (located in Shah Wali Kot District about 30 minutes drive north of the city)
Maiwand (where the famous 1880 Battle of Maiwand was fought between Afghan and British forces) 
Mausoleum of Mirwais Hotak (located in Mirwais Mina in the western part of Kandahar)
Mundigak (an Indus Valley site)
Narange Qala (meaning "Orange Castle")
Reg District (picnic area where men race SUVs in sand dunes)
Shrine of the Cloak (across the street from the Kandahar Governor's House)
Shrine of Baba Wali (hillside with trees providing great views of Arghandab River and farms)
Shrine of Sher Soorkh (coronation place of Ahmad Shah Durrani)

Nangarhar

Jalalabad, the capital of Nangarhar Province, has a number of hotels and tourist attractions. Below are some notable sites for travelers to visit in Nangarhar Province:
Amir Habibullah Khan Park (across the street from Siraj-ul-Emarat Park)
Darunta Dam
Ghazi Amanullah Khan Town (Ghazi Amanullah Khan Park and Ghazi Amanullah Khan International Cricket Stadium)
Mausoleum of Amanullah Khan (Siraj-ul-Emarat Park)
Mausoleum of Khan Abdul Ghaffar Khan
Mausoleum of Mohammad Gul Khan Momand
Torkham (border crossing between Afghanistan and Pakistan)

Nimruz

Below are some notable sites for travelers to visit in Nimruz Province:
Kamal Khan Dam (national park)
Zaranj (border town near the Afghanistan–Iran border)

Panjshir

Below are some notable sites for travelers to visit in Panjshir Province:
Mausoleum of Ahmad Shah Massoud in Bazarak
Panjshir Valley

Culture and security issues

Afghanistan is an Islamic country where alcohol and drugs are prohibited. In Islam, a tourist or a traveler is called a musafir. Such person is generally treated as a diplomat and well protected under Afghan culture. Every mosque is a place of ultimate protection against those wanting to cause harm. Although Afghans are generally very friendly to tourists or travelers, kidnapping for ransom still exists in the county. Several foreign tourists have been kidnapped and killed in Afghanistan in the past. Finding an honest and reliable tour guide is the key to safety in Afghanistan.

In June 2022, Taliban spokesman Zabiullah Mujahid said that "anyone" can visit Afghanistan for tourism, and the Ministry of Information and Culture started promoting it while claiming that Afghanistan is now safe. This, however, does not mean that unexploded ordnances or land mines no longer exist because they likely still do.

Stamps
Below is a series of old post stamps of Afghanistan from the 1960s and 1970s that promote tourism in the country.

See also
Economy of Afghanistan
Geography of Afghanistan
Visa policy of Afghanistan

References

External links

, Aug. 22, 2016, Arg (Office of the President of Afghanistan).

 
Afghanistan